The 1965 NCAA Skiing Championships were contested at the Crystal Mountain ski area in the Mount Baker-Snoqualmie National Forest in Pierce County, Washington at the twelfth annual NCAA-sanctioned ski tournament to determine the individual and team national champions of men's collegiate alpine skiing, cross-country skiing, and ski jumping in the United States.

Denver, coached by Willy Schaeffler, captured their ninth, and fifth consecutive, national championship, edging out Utah in the team standings. The downhill title went to Bill Marolt of Colorado, and Rick Chaffee of Denver won the slalom and the combined.

Venue

This year's championships were held March 25–28 in Washington at Crystal Mountain, located in the Mount Baker-Snoqualmie National Forest in Pierce County, southeast of Seattle. Opened in late 1962, the ski area was completing its third season.

The twelfth edition, these were the first championships held in Washington and the first in the Cascade Range.

Team scoring

Individual events
Four events were held, which yielded seven individual titles.
Thursday: Cross Country
Friday: Slalom 
Saturday: Downhill
Sunday: Jumping

See also
List of NCAA skiing programs

References

NCAA Skiing Championships
NCAA Skiing Championships
NCAA Skiing Championships
NCAA Skiing Championships
NCAA Skiing Championships
NCAA Skiing Championships
NCAA Skiing Championships
Skiing in Washington (state)